This is a list of properties and districts in McIntosh County, Georgia that are listed on the National Register of Historic Places (NRHP).

Current listings

|}

References

McIntosh
Buildings and structures in McIntosh County, Georgia